Star City is a  amusement park in Pasay, Philippines. It is located in the reclaimed area of the Cultural Center of the Philippines Complex, part of Bay City. The facility is owned by Star Parks Corporation, a subsidiary of Elizalde Holdings Corporation (the holding company of the FJE Group of Companies).

Star City was hit by a fire on October 2, 2019, causing major damage to the main building and forcing its closure. Prior to the fire, Star City had an annual attendance of about 1.5 million people. Star City had more than 30 different rides and attractions at the time of the fire, many of which were indoors. The park had initially planned to re-open by January 14, 2022, but due to a surge of COVID-19 cases in Metro Manila brought by the Omicron variant, it has been postponed until February 24, 2022.

History
The park was established in 1991 as an offshoot of the annual Toys and Gift Fair, a Christmas trade exhibition by the Philippine Center for International Trade and Exhibit (PhilCite), which was first organized in 1976. In the 1990s under Fred Elizalde, the fair evolved into an amusement park later named Star City. The former PhilCite building upon which the park was based upon was pulled down in the late 1990s to make way for the park's indoor rides.

2019 fire

Star City was hit by a major fire on October 2, 2019, which destroyed about 80 percent of the main Star City building, which housed over 30 rides and attractions. At least 25 of those were damaged in the fire, including Gabi ng Lagim, Dungeon of Terror, Bump Car Smash, and Snow World. The outdoor area, which includes the Star Flyer and Star Frisbee, was mostly spared by the fire. Initial damage estimates ranged from 15 million to 1 billion Philippine pesos.

2022 reopening
In December 2021, Star City's social media accounts posted a teaser suggesting that the amusement park would be reopened. The reopening was planned on January 14, 2022, however the opening has been postponed due to an increase of COVID-19 cases in Metro Manila brought by the Omicron variant amidst a pandemic of the disease which reached the metropolis in early 2020. After some delays, the park finally reopened on February 24, 2022.

Attractions

Prior to the 2019 fire, 70 percent of the facilities of Star City were covered and air-conditioned. The amusement park introduced various types of rides and attractions in the Philippines. It hosted the double-deck carousel, 360-degree-loop roller coaster (the Zyklon Loop), and water log ride (the Jungle Splash) in the country. It hosted Snow World, the largest permanent ice entertainment area in the country, which featured ice carvings, a snow play area and the country's longest ice slide. Another attraction in the amusement park was the inverted roller coaster Star Flyer, which opened in 2007 and was marketed as the first inverted coaster in the Philippines.

Star City hosts the Giant Star Wheel Ferris wheel. It has 32 air-conditioned gondolas, each seating up to six persons. In 2012, it was said to be the tallest Ferris wheel in the Philippines.

Within the amusement park complex are the Aliw and Star Theaters, with a combined seating capacity of 2,125, as well as the headquarters of Manila Broadcasting Company.

The amusement park has 25 operating rides upon its reopening in February 2022.

Incidents
 September 9, 2006: a 13-year-old patron died due to falling off the Wild River (now Jungle Splash) ride. On September 19, four days after its quiet "grand opening," the Pasay city engineering office ordered the suspension of operations of the amusement park coinciding with the same day that the management has reached a settlement with the family of the deceased patron and another but non-fatal incident at the amusement park's bump car ride. 
 February 7, 2018: The Star Flyer attraction suffered an electrical malfunction at 3:20 p.m., affecting about 10 riders came to a stop in the middle of its hanging tracks for about 15 minutes.
 July 8, 2018: A man died after falling from the top of the Giant Star Wheel ride on that night.
 October 2, 2019: A huge blaze caused widespread damage to Star City.

References

External links

Amusement parks in the Philippines
Tourist attractions in Metro Manila
Buildings and structures in Pasay
Indoor amusement parks
1991 establishments in the Philippines